Syed Mujtaba Ali (13 September 1904 – 11 February 1974) was a Bengali writer, journalist, travel enthusiast, academic, scholar and linguist. He lived in Bangladesh, India, Germany, Afghanistan and Egypt.

Early life and education
Ali was born on 13 September 1904 to a Bengali Muslim family in Karimganj, Sylhet district, British Raj. His father, Khan Bahadur Syed Sikander Ali, was a sub-registrar. He traced his paternal descent to Shah Ahmed Mutawakkil, a local holy man and a Syed of Taraf, though apparently unrelated to Taraf's ruling Syed dynasty. Ali's mother, Amatul Mannan Khatun, belonged to the Chowdhuries of Kala and Bahadurpur, an Islamised branch of the Pal family of Panchakhanda. Mujtaba was the youngest of three brothers, one of whom being the writer Syed Murtaza Ali.

Mujtaba Ali passed the matriculation exam from Sylhet Government Pilot High School though was said to have not passed his intermediate exam from MC College. In 1919 when Rabindranath Tagore was visiting Sylhet, Mujtaba Ali met Tagore who had great influence on Mujtaba Ali's writings. Later, in 1921 Mujtaba joined the Indian freedom struggle and left his school in Sylhet. In the same year 1921, he went to Visva-Bharati University in Santiniketan and graduated in 1926 with B.A. degree. He was among the first graduates of the Visva-Bharati. He studied for a brief period in Aligarh Muslim University. Later, he moved to Kabul to work in the education department (1927–1929) as a professor. From 1929 to 1932 he went to Germany with Wilhelm Humboldt scholarship and studied at the universities in Berlin and later in Bonn. He earned his PhD from the University of Bonn with a dissertation on comparative religious studies on Khojas in 1932.

Career
Ali then studied at the Al-Azhar University in Cairo during 1934–1935. He taught at colleges in Baroda (1936–1944) and Bogra (1949). He briefly lived in East Pakistan before moving back to India in 1949. After a brief stint at Calcutta University in 1950, he became Secretary of the Indian Council for Cultural Relations and editor of its Arabic journal Thaqafatul Hind. From 1952 to 1956 he worked for All India Radio at New Delhi, Cuttack and Patna. He then joined the faculty of Visva-Bharati University (1956–1964) as professor of German language and later of Islamic Culture. He lived in Calcutta till early 1972. Following the Liberation of Bangladesh, he moved with his family to Dhaka and lived there till his death in 1974.

Language activism
After the Partition of India into India and Pakistan in 1947, Ali went from India to the then East Pakistan. He was one of the first to call for Bangla as East Pakistan's state language on 30 November 1947, at the Sylhet Kendriya Muslim Sahitya Samsad. He was a prominent activist and supporter of Bengali as the national language of East Pakistan. In 1948, being the principal of Azizul Huq College, Bogra, he wrote an essay, 'The State Language of East Pakistan', which was printed in Chaturanga of Kolkata. During that time, the West Pakistan Rulers tried to impose Urdu as the only state language of East Pakistan while Bengali was spoken by most of the people. The government of Pakistan demanded an explanation. But Ali resigned and moved to India.

Linguistic abilities and literary works
Ali's mother tongue Bengali, but he could speak 14 languages – English, French, German, Italian, Arabic, Persian, Urdu, Hindi, Sanskrit, Marathi, Gujarati, Pashtu and Greek. Alongside Natya Guru Nurul Momen and Jajabar (Binay Mukhopadhyay), Ali was one of the trail-blazers of a unique category of Bengali writing. 'Ramya Rachana' in the Bengali language, an anecdotal story-telling – often based on real-life experiences – became immensely popular, mostly because of the attractive writing style of Ali. Deshe Bideshe, the story of his journey to and experiences in Kabul during his brief stint as professor in a college there is one of Ali's best works. Panchatantra is a collection of thoughts and short stories (some already published in 'Desh' magazine) of his days in Europe, Cairo and Baroda.

Bibliography
 Deshe Bideshe (1949)
 Panchatantra (1952)
 Abishwasya (1955)
 Chacha Kahini (1955)
 Mayurkanthi (1957)
 Jale Dangay (1957)
 Dhupchhaya (1958)
 Shabnam (1960)
 Chaturanga (1960)
 Shreshtha Galpa (1962)
 Parash Pathar (1962)
 Bahubichitra (1962)
 Bhabaghure O Anyanya (1962)
 Shreshtha Ramya Rachana (1962)
 Tunimem (1964)
 Duhara (1966)
 Pachandashai (1967)
 Shahriyar (1969)
 Hitler (1970)
 Kato Na Ashrujal (1971)
 Musafir (1971)
 Prem
 Dwandwa Madhur
 Tulanahina
 Raja Ujir
 Chalak Hobar Pahela Kitab

Death and legacy
In 1972, after the separation of the country, Ali returned to Bangladesh. He died on 11 February 1974. Extracts from his literary works are included in the curriculum of school level, secondary, higher secondary and graduation level Bengali Literature in both Bangladesh and India, particularly in the states of West Bengal and Tripura. He was awarded Ekushey Padak, the second highest civilian award in Bangladesh in 2005 by the Government of Bangladesh.

Awards
Narsinghadas Prize (1949)
Ananda Puraskar (1961) awarded by Anandabazar Group
Ekushey Padak (2005) by the Government of Bangladesh

See also
 List of Indian writers

References

Further reading
 Saiyad Mujtaba Ali Rachanabali (complete works), edited by Gajendrakumar Mitra, Sumathanath Ghosh, Sabitendranath Ray and Manish Chakrabarty, eleven volumes published by Mitra O Ghosh (Kolkata) 1974–1983.
 Saiyad Mujtaba Ali: Jibankatha, by Nurur Rahman Khan, published by Asiatic Society of Bangladesh (Dhaka) 1990.
 Mujtaba Sahityer Rupbaichitrya o Rachanashaili, by Nurur Rahman Khan, published by Bangla Academy (Dhaka) 1990.
 Prasanga: Mujtaba Ali, edited by Bijanbihari Purakayastha, published by Nabapatra Prakashan (Kalikata) 1998 (first published as Mujtaba Prasanga in Sylhet in 1977).
 Syed Mujtaba Ali: Proshongo Oproshongo by Golam Mostakim, who was close with Syed Mujtaba Ali from 1971 to 1974, till Syed Mujtaba Ali's death. The book illustrates Syed Mujtaba Ali as a person rather than a personality. Published by Student Ways, Dhaka, Bangladesh in 1995.

1904 births
1974 deaths
20th-century Indian novelists
Bengali novelists
Bangladeshi male novelists
Visva-Bharati University alumni
Humboldt University of Berlin alumni
University of Bonn alumni
Alumni of the University of London
University of Paris alumni
Al-Azhar University alumni
Aligarh Muslim University alumni
Academic staff of the University of Calcutta
Academic staff of Visva-Bharati University
Recipients of the Ananda Purashkar
People from Moulvibazar District
Recipients of the Ekushey Padak
Novelists from Assam
People from Karimganj district
20th-century Bengalis
Indian expatriates in Egypt
Indian expatriates in France
Indian expatriates in Afghanistan
Indian expatriates in Germany
Bangladeshi people of Arab descent
Bengali Muslims
Bengali-language writers